The Virtuoso is a 2021 American neo-noir crime thriller film directed and produced by Nick Stagliano. The film stars Anson Mount, Abbie Cornish, Eddie Marsan, Richard Brake, David Morse, and Anthony Hopkins. It follows a professional assassin who must track down and kill his latest target to satisfy an outstanding debt to his mentor.

Summary
An assassin is given a strange assignment by his mentor wherein he must kill a hitman. He is armed just with time and location of hitman, he must find, who really is his target.

Cast

Production
Filming occurred in January 2019 in Santa Ynez, California. Filming also occurred in Scranton, Pennsylvania in late March and early April 2019.

Release
In March 2021, Lionsgate Films acquired the North American and U.K. distribution rights to the film, which was simultaneously released in theaters and on VOD and digital on April 30, 2021.

It was released on DVD and Blu-ray on May 4, 2021, by Lionsgate Home Entertainment.

Reception
On review aggregator Rotten Tomatoes, the film holds an approval rating of 18%, based on 55 reviews, with an average rating of 4.1/10. The website's consensus reads, "Don't let the title -- or the talented cast -- fool you: The Virtuoso falls far shy of even base level competency in its attempts to wring fresh excitement from a threadbare assassin thriller setup." On Metacritic, the film has a weighted average score of 24 out of 100, based on 7 critics, indicating "generally unfavorable reviews".

Leslie Felperin of The Guardian gave the film 2 out of 5 stars and wrote:

References

External links

2021 action thriller films
2021 crime thriller films
2020s chase films
American action thriller films
American crime thriller films
American chase films
American neo-noir films
Films about assassinations
Films about snipers
Films shot in California
Films shot in Pennsylvania
Lionsgate films
2020s English-language films
2020s American films